Geisinger Health System (GHS) is a regional health care provider to central, south-central and northeastern Pennsylvania. Headquartered in Danville, Pennsylvania, Geisinger services over 3 million patients in 45 counties.

History
Geisinger is named after Abigail Geisinger, widow of iron magnate George Geisinger.

Its flagship facility is the Geisinger Medical Center (GMC) located in Danville, with nine other hospitals: Geisinger Bloomsburg Hospital in Bloomsburg, Pennsylvania, Geisinger Wyoming Valley (GWV) and Geisinger South Wilkes-Barre - both located in Wilkes-Barre, Geisinger-Community Medical Center (GCMC) located in Scranton, Geisinger Jersey Shore Hospital (GJSH) located in Jersey Shore, Pennsylvania, Geisinger Lewistown Hospital (GLH), in Lewistown, Pennsylvania,  Geisinger Muncy Medical Center (GMCM), in Muncy Pennsylvania, Geisinger Shamokin Community Hospital (GSACH) in Shamokin, Pennsylvania, and Geisinger St. Lukes in Orwigsburg, Pennsylvania. Geisinger has clinics throughout northeastern and western Pennsylvania, located in Wilkes-Barre, Pittston, Mountaintop, Nanticoke, Wyoming, Scranton, Dallas, Plains, Kingston, and other surrounding cities and towns.

Geisinger Health Plan, a subsidiary health management organization (HMO), was started in 1985.

On December 4, 2012, it was announced that Geisinger Health System and Lewistown Hospital had signed a non-binding letter of intent for a merger. Geisinger's Frank Trembulak said the non-binding letter refers to the specifics of how the merger will work and that there is a "binding agreement to merge".

Independent physicians have opposed a merger with Geisinger, stating that with the presence of a Geisinger clinic in Lewistown and with Geisinger offering health insurance, a monopoly might result from the merger, ultimately hurting instead of helping local healthcare.  The full merger and integration of Geisinger-Lewistown Hospital into Geisinger Health System received final approval from the Pennsylvania Attorney General and the Pennsylvania Department of Health and the new Geisinger-Lewistown Hospital became effective on November 1, 2013.

From 2001 through mid 2015, Glenn Steele served as Geisinger's president and chief executive officer. Steele left Geisinger in 2015, with David Feinberg joining as president and CEO. In December 2018, Jaewon Ryu was named interim president and CEO. Prior to the announcement, he previously served as the health system's executive vice president and chief medical officer since 2016.

About 
Geisinger Health System serves over half a million patients across multiple states in the Northeastern United States. Geisinger's primary geographical area of coverage is central and northeastern Pennsylvania. As of September 2021, it operates 11 hospitals as well as a number of smaller clinical care facilities and pharmacies.

The organization offers internal health insurance plans to the public within its coverage area. Geisinger also conducts medical research and operates both Geisinger Commonwealth School of Medicine and the Geisinger-Lewistown School of Nursing. The organization also has a charitable arm, the Geisinger Foundation.

Programs and practices 

In 2015, Geisinger launched a patient satisfaction program called ProvenExperience, which offers refunds of co-pays or deductibles to patients unhappy with their medical treatment or other aspects of care. In 2017, it started the Fresh Food Farmacy, a program that provides free healthy foods and nutrition advice to low-income patients with diabetes. In 2018, Geisinger introduced a program that drives patients unable to arrange their own transportation to medical appointments or pharmacies.

Geisinger incorporates electronic health records (EHRs) and genomics into its healthcare practices. Geisinger first adopted EHRs in 1996. By 2002, it was using Tel-a-Nurse, a service that allowed patients to call and receive medical advice from nurses informed by EHRS. In 2007, Geisinger opened a genetic biobank and screening program called MyCode, which sequences the genetic code of volunteer patients to screen them for risk markers of diseases. As of 2018, MyCode had obtained genetic information from over 200,000 patient volunteers. This bank of genetic material has also been used for medical research purposes.

Research 

In 1967, Geisinger was awarded a federal grant to study the effectiveness of medications to prevent heart attacks or their recurrence. In 1974, the Central Pennsylvania Chapter of the Arthritis Foundation awarded a grant to Geisinger to study the potential treatment of Raynaud syndrome with drugs normally used to treat high blood pressure at that time.

Geisinger has a database of electronic health records (EHR), and set up a genetics research program called MyCode in 2007. The use of EHR allows longitudinal study of patient outcomes through a study called "DiscovEHR". The program uses gene sequencing by the biotechnology company Regeneron Pharmaceuticals. The National Institutes of Health awarded a grant of  million to the research program in 2016. The program was expanded to include whole exome sequencing in 2018. Using the patient volunteers' genetic data stored in its MyCode program, Geisinger has conducted or collaborated on genetic research studies aimed at identifying potential links between genetic variants and risk factors for certain diseases. Geisinger contributed data from 35,000 of its patients to a 2016 Johns Hopkins University study that demonstrated linkages between asthma and fracking. In 2021, a Regeneron-led study partially based on genetic data from the MyCode biobank identified a genetic variant that appears to lower obesity risk.

Education 

On January 1, 2017, Geisinger acquired the Commonwealth School of Medicine in Scranton, Pennsylvania. Opened in 2008, the school had struggled financially prior to its acquisition. Geisinger agreed to assume the school's nearly $40 million debt as part of the acquisition. Geisinger Commonwealth School of Medicine received a $3.4 million grant from the federal government in 2017 to promote diversity and provide opportunities for disadvantaged communities. In order to "fix the primary care shortage facing the organization", Geisinger announced a program in 2019 to cover full tuition plus a $2,000 monthly stipend for 40 students committing to work at Geisinger for at least four years after completing a residency.

Facilities 

As of August 2021, there are 11 major facilities operated by Geisinger Health System:

 Geisinger Medical Center (GMC) in Danville
 Geisinger Janet Weis Children's Hospital in Danville
 Geisinger Wyoming Valley Medical Center (GWV) in Plains Township (Wilkes-Barre area)
 Geisinger South Wilkes-Barre Hospital (GSWB) in downtown Wilkes-Barre
 Geisinger - Shamokin Area Community Hospital (G-SACH) in Shamokin
 Geisinger - Community Medical Center (GCMC) in Scranton
 Geisinger - Bloomsburg Hospital (GBH) in Bloomsburg
 Geisinger - Lewistown Hospital (GLH) in Lewistown
 Geisinger Jersey Shore Hospital in Jersey Shore
 Geisinger St. Luke's Hospital in Orwigsburg
 Geisinger Schuylkill County in Orwigsburg
 Geisinger Marworth in Waverly

Financials 

For comparison, in 2017 the Pennsylvania average operating margin and total margin were 5.15% and 6.62% respectively. The Pennsylvania average uncompensated care percent of NPR was 1.74%. The Pennsylvania average  portion of NPR paid by Medicare and Medical Assistance was 34% and 14% respectively. The average payment per inpatient day for Medicare and Medical Assistance was $2,249 and $2,286 respectively, while other  commercial payers paid an average of $4,843 per inpatient day.

See also
Life Flight (Geisinger)

References

External links

Healthcare in Pennsylvania
Hospital networks in the United States
Medical and health organizations based in Pennsylvania
Trauma centers